Neville Henry Thornton (12 December 1918 – 12 September 1998) was a New Zealand rugby union player. A number eight, Thornton represented King Country and Auckland at a provincial level, and was a member of the New Zealand national side, the All Blacks, in 1947 and 1949. He played 19 matches for the All Blacks including three internationals.

During World War II, Thornton served with the 2nd New Zealand Expeditionary Force (NZEF), and in February 1945 he was commissioned as a second lieutenant in the New Zealand Infantry. Following the end of the war, he toured Britain and France with the NZEF rugby team, known as the "Kiwis", playing in 18 matches and scoring nine tries. After returning to New Zealand, Thornton studied at Auckland University College, graduating with a Bachelor of Arts in 1951 and a Master of Arts in 1959. A schoolteacher, Thornton was principal of Rotorua Boys' High School from 1960, and then Papakura High School until 1977.

References

1918 births
1998 deaths
Rugby union players from Auckland
People educated at Otahuhu College
University of Auckland alumni
New Zealand rugby union players
New Zealand international rugby union players
King Country rugby union players
Auckland rugby union players
Rugby union number eights
New Zealand schoolteachers
New Zealand military personnel of World War II